The Delhi Medical Council (DMC) is a State Medical Council and statutory body enacted under the Delhi Medical Council Act 1997 for regulating the practice of the modern system of medicine in Delhi.

Functions of the council
The main functions of the Delhi Medical Council:
 Keeping a directory of all registered medical practitioners in the GNCTD;
 Regulation the professional conduct of medical professionals;
 To act on the complaints of medical negligence of registered medical practitioners in GNCTD; and
 Registration of doctors and their qualifications.

See also
Medical Council of India

References

 
Organisations based in Delhi
Regulatory agencies of India
Health law in India
Organizations established in 1998
Medical regulation in India